P. Hanmanth Rao was an Indian politician. He was elected to the Lok Sabha, the lower house of the Parliament of India from Medak as a member of the Indian National Congress.

References

External links
 Official biographical sketch on the Parliament of India website

Indian National Congress politicians
Lok Sabha members from Andhra Pradesh
India MPs 1957–1962
India MPs 1962–1967
1909 births
Year of death missing